Jennifer Dulski is an American technology executive in Silicon Valley. She left Google in January 2013 to become president and COO of Change.org.

Career
After working for Yahoo! she became co-founder and CEO of The Dealmap, which was acquired in 2011 by Google, where she spent almost two years as a senior executive.

She currently serves on the boards of WW International, Inc., Move, Inc.,  Little Passports, and the Silicon Valley site of The Breakthrough Collaborative.

Dulski joined Change.org after taking action on a petition started by Trayvon Martin's parents, and was later recruited to join the team as its new COO and president. After Change.org, she served in a leadership role at Facebook on the Facebook Groups product.

In April 2020, she founded Rising Team. She is also the CEO of Rising Team.

Publishing
In 2018, Dulski published her first book, "Purposeful".

References

Living people
Cornell University alumni
American women business executives
American computer businesspeople
Businesspeople in information technology
American chief operating officers
American people of Polish descent
Year of birth missing (living people)
21st-century American women
Google people